Walk the Plank is the twelfth studio album by American punk rock band Zebrahead, released in Japan on October 7, 2015, and globally on October 16, 2015.

Track listing

Personnel
Zebrahead
Ali Tabatabaee – lead vocals
Matty Lewis – lead vocals, rhythm guitar
Dan Palmer – lead guitar, backing vocals
Ben Osmundson – bass guitar, backing vocals
Ed Udhus – drums, percussion

Charts

Release history

References

2015 albums
Zebrahead albums